Chitra Sen is an Indian actress and dancer who works in Bengali language films and television series. She has worked mainly in theatres, but she has also worked in films and on television. She started her career under Jnyanesh Mukhopadhyay. She has also worked with Rabi Ghosh. In Swapnasandhani, she has worked with her son Kaushik Sen.

Personal life
Chitra Sen (Chitra Mandal) was born in Calcutta (now Kolkata) in a Bengali family. Her father was Panchu Gopal Mandal and her mother was Arati Mandal. Sen took Manipuri and Bharatnatyam dance training from Balkrishna Menan and Shakti Nag. She married Shayamal Sen in 1966 who was also an actor and a student of Utpal Dutt. In the beginning, Chitra Sen worked under Shyamal Sen's direction. Her daughter-in-law Reshmi Sen is a dancer and actress and her grandson Riddhi Sen, son of Kaushik and Reshmi is also an aspiring actor.

Filmography
Joutuk (1958)
Komal Gandhar (1961)
Personal Assistant (1959)
City of Joy (1992)
Kanyadan (1993)
Unishe April (1994)
Bhoy (1996)
Anu (1999)
Daaybaddho (2000)
Cancer (2001)
Haraner Natjamai  (2002)
Path (2003)
Je Jon Thake Majhkhane (2006)
61 Garpar Lane (2017)
Konttho (2019)

Plays
Alakanandar Putra Kanya.
Jalchabi (with Rangrup theatre group under the direction of Seema Mukhopadhyay)
Maer Moto (based on a play of Kabita Singh directed by Mohit Chattopadhyay)
Bhalo Rakkhosher Galpo (with Swapnasandhani)
Aloka.

Television 
 Roilo Ferar Nimontron
 Ranga mathay Chiruni
 Subarnalata (TV series)
 Boyei Gelo
 Rajjotok
 Mon Niye Kachakachi
 Aaj Aari Kal Bhaab
 Kundo Phooler Mala
 Andarmahal(2017-2019)
 Nakshi Kantha(2018-2020)
 Sreemoyee(2019–present)
 Khorkuto (2022)

Awards

2010 Best actress award from the Government of West Bengal for her role in Jalchabi.

References

External links

Living people
Actresses from Kolkata
Bengali theatre personalities
Indian film actresses
Indian stage actresses
Indian television actresses
Bengali television actresses
Actresses in Bengali cinema
Bengali actresses
20th-century Indian actresses
21st-century Indian actresses
Bengali Hindus
Year of birth missing (living people)